Gladys Molefi Olebile Masire, Lady Masire (30 July 1931 – 17 May 2014) was a Botswana teacher and political figure who served as the longest ruling First Lady of Botswana from 1980 until 1998.

Early life and education
Gladys Molefi Olebile was born in 1931 in the village of Modimola, Mafikeng which was located in the Union of South Africa. She was the daughter of Fenkwane Mogwera and Mabu Mogwera. From her maternal side, she belonged to the Tawana-a-Tshidi Mina Tholo royal family. After graduating from Tigerkloof, she followed in her mother's footsteps in becoming a teacher for many years, firstly in her hometown of  Mafikeng and later at Kanye, Bechuanaland.

Career
In the 1980s, Lula Horace, the wife of U.S. Ambassador Horace Dawson, helped Olebile Masire establish Botswana's first charity. This charity was called the Child-to-Child Foundation of Botswana, and she was an honorary president of the foundation in 1996.

In 1990, Olebile Masire was a member of the Mandela National Reception Committee that helped prepare for Nelson Mandela's June 1990 visit to Gaborone after his release from Robben Island.

Personal life
She was married to the late former President of Botswana Sir Quett Ketumile Masire in 1958 and had six children.

Honors
Olebile Masire was the Patron of the Special Olympics Botswana from 1989 until 2013. In the 1996/97 school year, the University of Botswana established the Lady Olebile Masire Prize in her name. This award is given to a student with the highest grades in the Faculty of Engineering.

Olebile Masire was posthumously given the Presidential Order of Honour Award in 2016 by President Ian Khama.

Death
On 17 May 2014, Lady (Gladys) Olebile Masire died at Milpark Hospital in Parktown, Johannesburg, South Africa. She was buried in Kanye, Botswana, on 25 May 2014, a week later.

References

1931 births
2014 deaths
First ladies of Botswana
Botswana educators
Spouses of national leaders